Gol Bolagh-e Sofla (also Romanized as Gol Bolāgh-e Soflá and Golbāgh-e Soflá; also known as Gol Bolāgh, Golbolāgh-e Pā’īn, Kal Būlāgh, and Kalbulāq) is a village in Howmeh Rural District, in the Central District of Bijar County, Kurdistan Province, Iran. At the 2006 census, its population was 25, in 9 families. The village is populated by Kurds.

References 

Towns and villages in Bijar County
Kurdish settlements in Kurdistan Province